Lesnik, Leśnik, Lesník or Lešnik are Slavic words derived from the root word *lěsъ. (лѣсъ, "forest", modern les, лес). They may refer to:

Lešnik and Lješnik mean hazelnut in the South Slavic languages .
Lesník means forester in Czech.

Toponyms 

Leśnik (disambiguation), several places in 
Lesnik,

People 

August Lešnik, 
Robert Lešnik,

Other 
Lesnik (mythology), Russian and Serbian rendering of the Slavic demon of the forest (Greek Pan (god))

See also
Lješnica (disambiguation), Serbo-Croatian toponym